The nasal bridge is the upper, bony part of the human nose, which overlies the nasal bones.

Association with epicanthic folds
Low-rooted nasal bridges are closely associated with epicanthic folds. A lower nasal bridge is more likely to cause an epicanthic fold, and vice versa.

Dysmorphology
A lower or higher than average nasal bridge can be a sign of various genetic disorders, such as fetal alcohol syndrome. A flat nasal bridge can be a sign of Down syndrome (Trisomy 21), Fragile X syndrome, 48,XXXY variant Klinefelter syndrome,  or Bartarlla-Scott syndrome.

An appearance of a widened nasal bridge can be seen with dystopia canthorum, which is a lateral displacement of the inner canthi of the eyes. Dystopia canthorum is associated with Waardenburg syndrome.

See also
 Aquiline nose
 Bridge piercing

References

Nose